Mohammed Barhouma (Arabic: محمد برهومة), born 14 July 1972, is a Jordanian writer, media trainer, and researcher currently residing in Abu Dhabi, United Arab Emirates. He wrote for multiple newspapers include the Distour Newspaper, the Lebanese Sho'uon Al Awsat (Middle Eastern Affairs Newspaper), and the Palestinian Affairs magazine, Jordan Times (Al-Ray'ee), London-based Hayat newspaper, Al Ghad, Hafreyet News and many other political magazines and newspapers.

In 2016, he published his notable work, a book on religious reformations and the modern era, titled "Moral consciousness and its role in religious reform", which was published by the Emirates Center for Strategic studies and Research, and featured in the Abu Dhabi International Book Fair in May 2016.

Early life and education 

After completing his school years, Mohammed Barhouma, acquired his bachelor's degree in psychology and Arabic language at Yarmouk University, Amman, by August 1994. He also studied English for five years in the British Council, achieving high intermediate stage, almost advanced.

Newspapers  
Mohammed Barhoum worked for several newspapers, research and strategic studies centers and notable regional magazines throughout his last 25 years active in political writing and media training.

Career at the Distour Newspaper (1994) 
In 1994, after his graduation, Mohammed Barhouma was looking for a career. He sent his first article in November 1994, to the Distour Newspaper, and was laughed at for his young age and first-time writer status by the people at the post office (this was before the start of the internet, so you had to write articles and send them by mailing). He would publish four other articles for Al-Distour, however, they wouldn't send him any revenue for the published articles. He paused after the 4th article for this cause.

Career at Al-Ra'ee (1994–2001) 
In 1994, after pausing his writing for Al-Distour newspaper, Mohammed Barhouma, looked for other newspapers. He wrote for Al-Ray'ee Newspaper. This was his regular temporary job, where he used revenues to pay for his mom's essentials, since she stopped sewing due to old age and lack of concentration. During these seven years (1994–2001), Mohammed Barhouma would publish around 200 articles in Al-Raee, some articles were even featured on the front cover, gaining him status and reputation for his fresh start as a 21-year-old political writer, which at the time was unheard of, especially in politics, were authors were in the old age of over 45. This would be the start of his political career.

♦ Most of his articles that were published in Al-Raee cannot be found since they were distributed in hard copy before the advent of the digital copy and website.

Career at Al-Hayat Newspaper (1994–2014 and 2017–) 
In 1994, Mohammed Barhouma, at the age of 21, started working for Al Hayat newspaper, a Middle-eastern focused newspaper, owned by Saudi Prince Khalid bin Sultan. It is the second newspaper he started writing for. His career included writing around 500 articles for Al Hayat. Despite him as a registered writer for 25 years for this newspaper, he did not write as frequently as he wrote for other newspapers including Al Ghad. This is because in 2014, while working for Emirates Centre for Strategic Studies and Research, he paused writing for Al-Hayat, and in 2017, when he started working for Emirates Policy Center, he resumed writing, this formed a date gap.

♦ Notable Articles for Al-Hayat include:

 "Jordan and the Diplomatic Challenge in the Energy Field" written on 7 July 2010 
 "That Correction should be the priority for the new Jordanian government" written on 16 February 2011 
 "America during the participation of Islamists" written on 2 March 2011 
 "Is the Arab Spring shading reality?" written on 8 November 2011 
"The evolution of the Jordanian role in the Syrian conflict" written on 26 June 2012
"The role of youth in Social media, and the importance of physiology" written on 22 May 2013
"The moral consistency hole" written on 14 September 2013
"The Gulf States and the maintenance of the regional weight" written on 1 November 2013
 "A notification to Heyder Abbadi" written on 19 December 2014 
 "Razaz and some of the questions of Jordan" written on 14 June 2018

Career at Al-Ghad Newspaper (2008–) 
While still writing for Al-Hayat newspaper, Mohammed Barhouma, started writing for Al Ghad Newspaper, in 2008. His first article published, "The Journey of Bush, and Central Stability" on 18 January 2008. Since the start of his career for Al Ghad, he wrote articles in the categories of lifestyle, politics, psychology and religion. Some of his notable articles over the times include:

♦ Early (2008–2009)

 "No retreat from Iraq, prior to 2011" written on 21 February 2008
"The future of the American-Kurdish relations" written on 29 March 2008
"The Criticism of Arab liberalism" written on 13 June 2008
"Our copy of modernism through religious rationalism" written on 9 October 2008
"The Positive Secularism" written on 28 September 2008
"The Obama Administration" written on 5 December 2008
"The Basis to the differences between Arabs" written on 21 January 2009
"Arrogance over weakness, and the creation of hope" written on 9 March 2009
"The Fights between the American allies" written on 25 March 2009
"Is Iran ready for negotiations?" written on 9 April 2009

♦ Past (2009–2012)

 "The Psychology of Depression, and our connection to the world" written on 7 June 2009
 "The collapse of religious democracy" written on 8 July 2009
 "Don't destroy it!" written on 14 February 2010
 "Wikileaks and Israeli diplomacy" written on 3 December 2010
 "We either live, or die together" written on 9 January 2011
 "More blood." written on 5 October 2012

♦ Modern (2013–)

 "A different beauty queen" written on 4 October 2013
 "A difficult numeral" written on 20 December 2013
 "An opportunity for Turkey, or its doom?" written on 10 October 2014 
 "Mosquito and the swamp" written in the late months of 2014
 "The Psychology of the President" written on 5 March 2016
 "Do we need 'Trump's ideology' too?" written on 11 November 2016
 "The War on Geography" written on 31 March 2017
 "Not an attractive methodology" written on 5 January 2018

These are a few mentions of the notable articles, over the 10 years of writing years active in this newspaper. In those years, Mohammed Barhouma has written over 700 articles that were published in Al Ghad, and continues to write to this day. He publishes articles weekly to Al-Ghad.

Career at Hafreyet (2017–) 
In 2017, Hafreyet was founded. Mohammed Barhouma is one of the first writers for this news website, he wrote over 100 articles for this website including a diverse amount of topics that include religion, thought, psychology and politics. Some of the notable articles of that were written by him for this news website include:

 "A culture of violence or a culture of love?" written on 29 October 2017
 "Saudi Arabia flips the page of Islamic ignorance" written on 4 November 2017
 "Violence.. Inherent in the structure of tyrannical, corrupt and extremist" written on 11 December 2017
 "What happened to the traditional brains of the extremist groups in Yemen?" written on 24 December 2017
 "War on Terror is a priority for Jordan in 2018" written on 14 January 2018
 "Stories to modify 'The Frame' ... At least" written on 6 February 2018
 "Religion is not only an odd dimension" written on 22 March 2018
 "Religiosity and the Arab crisis" written on 2 April 2018 
 "Mood swings for leaders: Trump's remarks on Syria as a model" written on 4 April 2018

Personal life

Jordan 

Mohammed Barhouma spent his entire early life in Jordan, and after graduation from Yarmouk University, resided in his home town, Amman, for seven years. He would write for Al-Distour and Al-Ra'ee in this time period. He wouldn't be part of a research centre, however.

United Arab Emirates 

In 2001, Mohammed Barhouma came to the United Arab Emirates, where he started working for Emirates Center for Strategic Studies and Research (ECSSR), and wrote for Al-Hayat, and Al-Ghad. He also published his notable book on behalf of this research center. In 2016, Mohammed Barhouma moved to the Emirates Policy Centre. In 2017, Mohammed Barhoum started writing for Hafreyet News.

Side contributions 
Some of the contributions by Mohammed Barhouma include his contributions to various articles from 1994–96 for Shou'an Al Awsat magazine and Palestinian Affairs magazine. He also was part-contributor to multiple featured articles. During his career at Emirates Center for Strategic Studies and Research, he contributed in publishing many books with other notable authors throughout the region.

He also has trained over 100 students at Emirates Policy Center as a role of media trainer. On top of that, Mohammed Barhouma has contributed in multiple research campaigns led by his center.

Achievements 
Other than his 2,000 written published articles, one of his notable achievements includes his book "Moral consciousness and its role in religious reform" which was published by the Emirates Center for Strategic Studies and Research, in 2016. It talks about religion and the modern era. This book shares its views on the ideas that are lacking in the modern Arab world that are pushing an Arab renaissance, and a scientific, enlightenment revolution to occur returning the status of the Golden Age in the 7th through 13th century.

Some comments from political websites on this major work include:"It can be said that this study attempts to stare critically at the ideals and religious values, reform and restructure them and put moral consciousness and the ethical issue in their appropriate practical context, by exposing them to the considerations of rights culture and private and public freedoms, as stated in the International Covenants. The human consciousness that has settled in our time on the centrality and independence of the human being, linking it to the issue of power, governance and public affairs management, to the establishment of the idea of faith as a direct relationship with human knowledge, science, culture and freedom, is not an inverse relationship with all that. " Eram News♦ Another commentary by Riy'e-El-Youm:"In his new book he works on the idea that moral reform seeks to prevent the clash of religion with freedom or the shackling of knowledge. He believes that there is no complete effort or project for Renaissance, enlightenment and religious reform in the Arab region and the Islamic world, in general, without engaging in the idea of reforming the ideals and religious values, and providing scientifically coherent theoretical and philosophical efforts regarding the nature of the relationship between religion and morality, by building On the ideas and efforts scattered in the Arab and Islamic heritage discussed this issue in the past, and the approach of the moral question, but did not insist on criticizing those ideas and efforts and dismantling, organizing, developing and framing them in the context of the development of "ethics" in Arab civilization based on the human common General. Mohamed Barhouma draws attention to the fact that this was available in the golden centuries of Islamic civilization, especially in the period between the 2nd and 5th century Hijri, but the civilized retreat that began with the ages of decadence prevented the crystallization of this great civilized project."♦ Another commentary by 2ooli News, about the book, quoted:"This study comes at a political time when Salafist jihadist currents kidnap the human, moral and civilized dimension of Islam, and hence the study focuses on saying that the location of human morality in the fields of faith and Sharia in the form provided by Salafi religious thinking and the owners Religious ideologies can justify what is immoral in the name of religion, when it is transformed into an ideology, and when religious texts and teachings are interpreted in a strict manner that collide with the needs and interests of people and their human and human gains as presented and provided by the experiences of political Islam and Salafists In more than one Arab or Islamic country, where the moral, human and civilized dimension of Islam is almost in the test." – 2ooli News

Records 
Other than book reviews and commentaries from known political review websites, Mohammed Barhouma earned records in article attention. He has an estimated three million article views in total, and over thirty thousand shares. He earned an award from the Abu Dhabi Book Fair 2016, for his notable book "Moral Consciousness and its role in religious reform". Apart from monetary awards, he has earned "Top Article of the Day" tag over thirty times throughout his career.

References

Sources 
 Al-Ghad News, biography and profile, https://www.alghad.com/members/58-%D9%85%D8%AD%D9%85%D8%AF-%D8%A8%D8%B1%D9%87%D9%88%D9%85%D8%A9
 Hafreyet, biography and profile, https://www.hafryat.com/ar/%D9%85%D8%AD%D9%85%D8%AF-%D8%A8%D8%B1%D9%87%D9%88%D9%85%D8%A9?page=1
 Erem News, https://www.eremnews.com/latest-news/130261

1972 births
Living people
Jordanian journalists
Jordanian writers